This is a list of Carnegie libraries in the Caribbean. Although most of Carnegie's philanthropic efforts were aimed at North America and Europe, a handful of libraries are scattered in other English-speaking areas of the world.

There are six Carnegie libraries in the Caribbean region spanning six countries.

Notes

References

Carnegie libraries
Caribbean
Carnegie libraries